Mahendra Bahadur Shahi is a Nepalese politician and former Chief Minister of Karnali, a province in western Nepal. He was member of the 1st Nepalese Constituent Assembly and Minister of Energy, Nepal. He was unanimously selected Parliamentary Party leader of CPN (MC) for Karnali on 14 February 2018.

He was appointed as the chief minister, according to Article 168 (1) of the Constitution of Nepal and took the oath of his office and secrecy as a chief minister on 17 February 2018.

Early life
Mahendra Bahadur Shahi was born in Nanikot (now Pachaljharana) Kalikot, Nepal to Laal Bahadur Shahi and Rankauda Shahi.

References

Living people
Communist Party of Nepal (Maoist Centre) politicians
1977 births
People from Kalikot District
Chief Ministers of Nepalese provinces
Members of the Provincial Assembly of Karnali Province
Members of the 2nd Nepalese Constituent Assembly
Nepal MPs 2022–present